Giske is an island municipality in Møre og Romsdal county, Norway. The municipality lies north-northwest of the town of Ålesund in the traditional district of Sunnmøre. The municipal centre is Valderhaugstrand. Other population centres include the villages of Roald (on Vigra island) and Alnes and Leitebakk (both on Godøya island). The municipality is part of the Ålesund Region.

The  municipality is the 349th largest by area out of the 356 municipalities in Norway. Giske is the 124th most populous municipality in Norway with a population of 8,597.

General information

Giske Municipality was established on 1 January 1908 when it was separated from the large municipality of Borgund. The initial population of the new municipality was 1,708 and it included the islands of Valderøya, Godøya, and Giske. During the 1960s, there were many municipal mergers across Norway due to the work of the Schei Committee. Then on 1 January 1964, the neighbouring Vigra Municipality (on the island of Vigra) was merged into Giske Municipality. The newly enlarged municipality had a population of 4,644.

Name
The municipality is named after the farm and island of Giske, since the first Giske Church was built there. The name is (probably) identical with the word gizki which means "tablecloth" or "rag" (maybe because the island is small and flat).

Coat of arms
The coat of arms was granted on 14 June 1985, but it has old roots. It is a gold lion rampant (i.e. in walking position) guardant (i.e. facing the viewer) on a blue shield. The arms are based on the old seal of Erling Vidkunsson, who already used the lion on his seal in 1355. His family was one of the most wealthy and influential families in the county, and had their origins and estate on Giske.

Churches
The Church of Norway has three parishes within the municipality of Giske. It is part of the Nordre Sunnmøre prosti (deanery) in the Diocese of Møre.

Recording Studio
Giske Harbor Hall (Øygardshallen) is an internationally renowned, purpose-built recording studio located on the shore of the Giske island's former harbor. It looks like an old boathouse and also operates as a concert hall. The British band New Model Army recorded its album "From Here" (2019) in this special recording studio.

Government
All municipalities in Norway, including Giske, are responsible for primary education (through 10th grade), outpatient health services, senior citizen services, unemployment and other social services, zoning, economic development, and municipal roads. The municipality is governed by a municipal council of elected representatives, which in turn elect a mayor. The municipality falls under the Møre og Romsdal District Court and the Frostating Court of Appeal.

Municipal council
The municipal council of Giske is made up of 23 representatives that are elected to four year terms. Interestingly, in the 2007 municipal elections, Giske recorded the highest vote for the Christian Democratic Party in all of Norway at 43.2 percent. The party breakdown of the council is as follows:

Mayor
The mayors of Giske (incomplete list):
2015–present: Harry Valderhaug (KrF)
2003-2015: Knut Støbakk (KrF)

Geography

The municipality is composed of four main islands: Giske, which gives its name to the municipality because of its historical importance, Vigra, which is where Ålesund's airport is located, Valderøya, where the municipal administration is located, and Godøya. There are also many smaller islands within its boundaries. The Alnes Lighthouse, Erkna Lighthouse, and Storholmen lighthouse are all located on islands in the municipality.

The main islands are all connected to the mainland of Norway by a network of tunnels and bridges. Godøy Tunnel connects Godøy to Giske island. Giske Bridge connects Giske island and Valderøy. A causeway connects Vigra island and Valderøy island. All islands are connected to Valderøy island which is where the main Valderøy Tunnel connects the whole municipality to Ellingsøya island in Ålesund Municipality. Finally, the Ellingsøy Tunnel connects that island to the town of Ålesund.

Climate
Giske is situated at the coast and has a temperate oceanic climate (Cfb) with very mild winters for the latitude, sometimes with strong winds in winter and late autumn. All-time high is  recorded 28 July 2018, while the all-time low is  recorded January 2016. Winter lows rarely go below . Coldest month on record was February 1966 with mean  , warmest month was August 2003 with mean  .

History
Giske is the site of Mjelthaugen, an ancient burial place dating from the Bronze Age. The site was the location of excavations in 1847, 1867 and 1878. Giske is also the place where, according to Snorre Sturlason, Harald Fairhair had his hair cut after uniting Norway. The historic Giske Church is also located on the island of Giske.

Notable people 
 Tora Torbergsdatter (born 1025 on Giske – ca.1066) a Norwegian royal consort and the mother of two kings of Norway
 Peggy Hessen Følsvik (born 1960 in Vigra) a Norwegian trade unionist
 Marianne Synnes (born 1970 in Vigra) a medical laboratory scientist, molecular biologist and politician

References

External links

Municipal fact sheet from Statistics Norway 

 
Municipalities of Møre og Romsdal
1908 establishments in Norway